Israel sent a delegation to compete at the 1988 Summer Paralympics in Seoul, South Korea. Its athletes finished 18th in the overall medal count.

Nations at the 1988 Summer Paralympics
1988
Summer Paralympics